Manolis Sbokos (born 19 February 2003) is a Greek professional footballer who plays as a centre-back for Super League 2 club Kifisia.

References

2003 births
Living people
Greek footballers
Greece youth international footballers
Super League Greece 2 players
OFI Crete F.C. players
A.E. Kifisia F.C. players
Association football defenders